Dan Golden may refer to:
Daniel Golden, American journalist
Dan Golden (filmmaker), American composer and film maker